Spring 1990: So Glad You Made It is a two-CD live album by the rock band the Grateful Dead.  It was recorded in March 1990, and contains selections from the band's 18-CD box set Spring 1990. It was released on September 18, 2012.

Critical reception

On AllMusic, Fred Thomas said, "Some seasoned Deadheads consider the 1990 spring tour to be one of the best of the band's legendary live history, citing consistently strong shows and a renewed sense of fire. Certainly by this point, their musicianship was second nature, and set lists on this tour were more inspired and fluid than on weaker tours. The song selection on So Glad You Made It emphasizes how tuned-in the sets were, with a wide cross section of crowd favorites like "Playing in the Band", later-period compositions like "West L.A. Fadeaway", and deep jams on songs like "Eyes of the World" and "Bird Song". Beginning with a playful take on Sam Cooke's "Let the Good Times Roll", the scene is set for impassioned performances and full-hearted playing from the band."

Track listing

Personnel

Grateful Dead
Jerry Garcia – lead guitar, vocals
Mickey Hart – drums
Bill Kreutzmann – drums
Phil Lesh – electric bass, vocals
Brent Mydland – keyboards, vocals
Bob Weir – rhythm guitar, vocals

Production
Produced by Grateful Dead
Produced for release by David Lemieux
Executive producer: Mark Pinkus
Associate producer: Doran Tyson
Recorded and mixed live by John Cutler
CD mastering by Jeffrey Norman
Quotation in "A Brief History" by Lenny Kaye
Original art: Wes Lang
Photos: James R. Anderson, Michael H. Laurentus Sr.
Art direction and design: Steve Vance
Liner notes: David Lemieux

References

Grateful Dead live albums
2012 live albums
Rhino Entertainment live albums